Norland College is a British higher education provider based in Bath, Somerset. The college specialises in childcare, and is widely known for its prestigious training of nannies, nursery nurses and other childcare professionals, who are employed worldwide.

Norland nannies are seen as a status symbol and are popular among celebrities and royals. Alumni are termed "Norlanders". Norland offers one degree programme: the BA (Hons) in Early Years Development and Learning, previously in association with the University of Gloucestershire. In March 2019, Norland was awarded Taught Degree Awarding Powers by the Privy Council, which allows it to offer the degree through their institution, as well as enabling it to mark all student assessments internally. It also offers the prestigious Norland Diploma.

History
Norland was founded in 1892 by Emily Ward. It is the world's oldest childcare training institution. Ward believed in affectionate care which focused on the needs of the child and wanted to train nannies that would devote themselves to their charges and avoid using corporal punishment as much as possible. 

Throughout its history, Norland has been based at various locations throughout the United Kingdom, notably Chislehurst in Kent and Denford Park near Hungerford in Berkshire, and is currently based in Bath. Originally, Norland contained daycare and boarding facilities for infants alongside the training college for nannies. Norland in its current iteration in Bath is solely an educational institute.

In February 1999, the first male nanny trainee was accepted, and in 2012 the first male undergraduate was admitted.

In 2005–2006, a documentary called Nanny School was filmed showing a year at Norland. It consisted of 15 episodes (5 per term) and was shown on Discovery Home and Health in October 2007.

Norland opened a nursery in the summer 2009, but it closed in 2013 for financial reasons.

Curriculum 

Students obtain a three-year BA in Early Years Development and Learning, followed by a fourth low-income year working in a family on a similar trainee basis. This year is called the Newly Qualified Nanny (NQN) year and only graduates of this are awarded their Norland Diploma. Students at Norland rotate terms between lectures in a classroom and placements in families, schools and nurseries, as well as at the Royal United Hospital on the maternity ward. They are also trained in tactical driving and self-defence in case they are hired by high-profile clients whose children might need such protection.

In addition to being a higher education provider, Norland also functions as an agency that places graduates with families for the duration of the graduate's career.

References

Bibliography
 Penelope Stokes, Norland: The Story of the First One Hundred Years, Publ: The Norland College, 1992.

External links
 Norland College Homepage
 2022 BBC video on Norland
 2002 Guardian article on Norland

Child care skills organizations
Education in Bath, Somerset
Educational institutions established in 1892
1892 establishments in England